Than Khoáng Sản Việt Nam Women's Football Club is a Vietnam women's football club, based in Quảng Ninh, Vietnam. The team will play in the Vietnam women's football championship.

The team is currently playing at Cẩm Phả Stadium.

History 
The club was founded in 1998 as Than Việt Nam W.F.C in Quảng Ninh, Vietnam.

Honours

Domestic competitions

League
 Vietnam women's football championship
  Winners (2): 2007, 2012

Current squad
As of May 2017

References
 

Women's football in Vietnam